Soup alla Canavese is an Italian soup made from white stock, tomato puree, butter, carrot, celery, onion, cauliflower, bacon fat, Parmesan cheese, parsley, sage, salt and pepper.

See also
 List of Italian soups
 List of soups

References

External links
 

Italian soups
Cuisine of Piedmont